Buried Country is the name of a documentary film, book, and soundtrack album released in 2000, and a stage show which toured from 2016 to 2018. A prosopography created by Clinton Walker, it tells the story of Australian country music in the Aboriginal community by focussing on the genre's most important stars.

Components
The book Buried Country: The Story of Aboriginal Country Music by Clinton Walker was published by Pluto Press in 2000.

The Film Australia documentary was directed by Andy Nehl, written by Walker, and narrated by Kev Carmody.

The 2-CD set Buried Country: Original Film Soundtrack (Larrikin Records) produced by Walker contains 45 classic and rare tracks featured in the book and film.

Buried Country has also been produced as a touring stage show that had its premiere at the Playhouse in Newcastle, New South Wales in August 2016, starring surviving elders of the tradition and a younger generation of singers and songwriters. It continued to tour the festival circuit until 2018. It featured a rotating cast of the original artists, with backing band the Backtrackers.

Featured artists
1940s-50s
Jimmy Little
Georgia Lee
Vic Sabrino
Herbie Laughton
1960s-70s
Dougie Young
Black Allan Barker
Lionel Rose
Vic Simms
Bobby McLeod
Harry and Wilga Williams
George and Ken Assang
1970s-80s
Gus Williams
Auriel Andrew
Bob Randall
Isaac Yamma
1980s-90s
Roger Knox
Kevin Gunn
 Warren H. Williams
Kev Carmody
Troy Cassar-Daley
Archie Roach
Ruby Hunter
Tiddas
Warumpi Band

References

External links
Official website
YouTube channel
Music Australia Collection Listing for Buried Country: The Story of Aboriginal Country Music by Clinton Walker
Screen Australia Film Listing

2000 non-fiction books
2000 films
Australian country music
Indigenous Australian musicians
Australian documentary films
Books about Australian music
Documentary films about country music and musicians
2000 soundtrack albums
Documentary films about Aboriginal Australians
Documentary film soundtracks